Thomas Newport, 1st Baron Torrington  (c. 1655 – 27 May 1719), styled The Honourable from 1675 until 1716, was an English barrister and Whig politician who sat in the English and British House of Commons between 1695 and 1716 when he was raised to the peerage as Baron Torrington.

Early life
Born in High Ercall, Newport was the fifth and second surviving son of Francis Newport, 1st Earl of Bradford, and his wife Lady Diana Russell, daughter of Francis Russell, 4th Earl of Bedford. He matriculated at Christ Church, Oxford, on 21 May 1672, aged 17, and was called to the Bar by the Inner Temple in 1678 He became a reader of Inner Temple in 1700.

Political career
At the 1695 general election, Newport was returned as Member of Parliament for Ludlow and also became a freeman of Ludlow. At the 1698 general election, he was initially defeated at Ludlow, but petitioned and was seated on 1 March 1699. In 1699 he was appointed to the post of Commissioner of Customs which he held until 1712. At the general election of January 1701, Newport was elected as MP for Winchelsea but irregularities in the poll resulted in the Mayor being imprisoned and the election declared void on 27 February 1701. There was no re-election before the November 1701 election at which Newport did not stand.

Newport returned to parliament at the 1715 general election, when he was returned unopposed as MP for (Much) Wenlock on the interest of his brother, Lord Bradford. Also in 1715, he was appointed a Lord of the Treasury and held this office until 1718. He vacated his seat at Wenlock in 1716, when he was raised to the Peerage of Great Britain as Baron Torrington, of Torrington, in the County of Devon on 20 June. Newport was sworn of the Privy Council of Great Britain on 30 March 1717. From March 1718, he served as one of the four Teller of the Exchequer until his death in 1719.

Death and legacy
Torrington died on 27 May 1719 and was buried in Wroxeter. He married three times. His first wife was Lucy Atkyns, daughter of Sir Edward Atkyns. After her death in 1696, he married Penelope Mary Bridgeman, daughter of Sir Orlando Bridgeman, 1st Baronet, in Chelsea, London, on 22 July 1700. She died only five years later and he married thirdly Anne Pierrepont, daughter of Robert Pierrepont, on 8 July 1709. There were no children by any wife and on his death, the barony became extinct. He left his collection of paintings to his brother, Lord Bradford.

References

Alumni of Christ Church, Oxford
Barons in the Peerage of Great Britain
Peers of Great Britain created by George I
Newport, Thomas
Members of the Inner Temple
Newport, Thomas
Members of the Privy Council of Great Britain
Newport, Thomas
1650s births
1719 deaths
Newport, Thomas
Newport, Thomas
Newport, Thomas